Imran Nazir Khan is an Indian actor. He is best known for playing character as Amar in Maddam Sir, as Rahul in Humari Bahu Silk and as Brogon in State of Siege: 26/11.

Early life 
Khan was born in Kashmir.

Career 
Khan made his acting debut in the year 2019 with the TV series Abhay playing role as DJ Yoko. In the same year he acted as Director Ganesh in TV series Gathbandhan, as Rahul in Humari Bahu Silk and as Firdous in Aladdin. In 2020, Khan played as Brogon in the film State of Siege: 26/11.
He acted in TV series Pratiksha in the year 2021.
In 2022, he played character Amar in TV Series Maddam Sir.

Filmography

References 

Indian actors
Living people
Indian male voice actors
Indian television actors
Year of birth missing (living people)